Kannapolis is a city in Cabarrus and Rowan counties, in the U.S. state of North Carolina, northwest of Concord and northeast of Charlotte and is a suburb in the Charlotte metropolitan area. The city of Kannapolis was incorporated in 1984. The population was 53,114 at the 2020 census, which makes Kannapolis the 19th largest city in North Carolina. It is the home of the Kannapolis Cannon Ballers, the Low-A baseball affiliate of the Chicago White Sox, and it is the hometown of the Earnhardt racing family. It is also the headquarters for the Haas F1 racing team. The center of the city is home to the North Carolina Research Campus, a public-private venture that focuses on food, nutrition, and biotech research.

History

Name
Early meaning and usage of the city's name was a direct reference to Cannon Mills Corporation, or James William Cannon himself. Early published name variations include "Cannon-opolis" and "Cannapolis". A widely accepted origin of the word "Kannapolis" comes from the combination of the Greek words kanna (reeds, not looms) and polis (city), which some believed meant "City of Looms". Dr. Gary Freeze, Catawba College history and politics department chairman, said a Concord newspaper used the name "Cannon City" in 1906. After mill workers or newspapers called the town "Cannapolis", J.W. Cannon asked Cabarrus County commissioners to give the town the name, but starting with a "K". Kannapolis historian Norris Dearmon said the K might have been to distinguish the town from his Concord mill village. Since, Freeze said, "Jim Cannon didn't study Greek," Cannon did not name the town "city of looms". In 1906 J.W. Cannon purchased the land that later became Kannapolis, and acquired a total of 1,008 acres in Cabarrus and Rowan Counties. Approximately 808 of those acres of farmland, purchased along the historic wagon road between Salisbury and Charlotte, became the location of the new textile mill, Cannon Manufacturing. Cannon Manufacturing began production in 1908. In 1914 Cannon Manufacturing became known as the world's largest producer of sheets and towels. Shortly after, Mr. Cannon opened plants in Rowan County, Concord and in South Carolina totaling 20,000 workers. Mill founder J.W. Cannon's youngest son, Charles A. Cannon, consolidated all the separate mills into the giant Cannon Mills Company in 1928.

Geography

Kannapolis is located on the boundary of Cabarrus and Rowan counties, with a greater portion of its area in Cabarrus County. U.S. Route 29 (Cannon Boulevard) passes through the city east of the downtown area; U.S. 29 leads northeast  to Salisbury and south  to Concord. Interstate 85 bypasses the city on the south and the east, with access from Exits 54 through 63 (five exits total). I-85 leads northeast  to Greensboro and southwest  to Charlotte.

Demographics

2020 census

As of the 2020 United States census, there were 53,114 people, 17,248 households, and 12,092 families residing in the city.

2000 census
As of the census of 2000, there were 36,910 people, 14,804 households, and 10,140 families residing in the city.  The population density was 1,236.5 people per square mile (477.4/km2). There were 15,941 housing units at an average density of 534.0 per square mile (206.2/km2). The racial makeup of the city was: 77.74% White, 16.45% Black or African American, 6.33% Hispanic or Latino American, 0.86% Asian American, 0.34% Native American, 0.01% Native Hawaiian or Other Pacific Islander, 3.43% some other race, and 1.16% two or more races.

There were 14,804 households, out of which 30.0% had children under the age of 18 living with them, 50.4% were married couples living together, 13.5% had a female householder with no husband present, and 31.5% were non-families. 26.5% of all households were made up of individuals, and 11.4% had someone living alone who was 65 years of age or older.  The average household size was 2.46 and the average family size was 2.96.

In the city, the population was spread out, with 24.2% under the age of 18, 9.0% from 18 to 24, 30.4% from 25 to 44, 20.8% from 45 to 64, and 15.6% who were 65 years of age or older.  The median age was 36 years. For every 100 females, there were 93.7 males.  For every 100 females age 18 and over, there were 90.0 males.

The median income for a household in the city was $35,532, and the median income for a family was $42,445. Males had a median income of $30,990 versus $23,277 for females. The per capita income for the city was $17,539.  About 7.7% of families and 10.5% of the population were below the poverty line, including 14.6% of those under age 18 and 10.7% of those age 65 or over.

Arts and culture

National Register of Historic Places
The Meek House and Harvey Jeremiah Peeler House are listed on the National Register of Historic Places.

Museums
 Curb Museum for Music and Motorsports

Sports
 Kannapolis Cannon Ballers, Class "A" Baseball Affiliate of the Chicago White Sox
 Stewart-Haas Racing, a NASCAR Cup Series team established by Gene Haas
 Haas F1 Team, a Formula One team, also established by Gene Haas

Parks and recreation

Public
Kannapolis has several public recreational areas. These include parks, athletic fields and greenways. One public park in the city, Vietnam Veterans Park (formerly, North Cabarrus Park) is
maintained and operated by Cabarrus County.
 Bakers Creek Park
 Dale Earnhardt Plaza
 Veterans Park
 Vietnam Veterans Park (formerly, North Cabarrus Park)
 Village Park
 Walter M. Safrit Park

Private 
 The Club at Irish Creek (formerly, Kannapolis Country Club)
 Kannapolis Recreation Park

Education

K-12 
Kannapolis City Schools is the primary school system for the city. Two additional systems also serve its jurisdiction: Cabarrus County Schools and Rowan–Salisbury School System.

Faith Christian Academy (FCA) is a private, non-profit Christian educational institution that is operated by Faith Baptist Church. Faith Christian Academy offers a combination of the A Beka program (K5-2nd grade) and the Alpha-Omega computerized, individual learning program (3rd-12th grade). FCA was organized in 1982.

Franklin Heights Christian Academy (FHCA) is a private, non-profit Christian educational institution that is operated by Franklin Heights Baptist Church. FHCA was organized in 2009. This school is now closed.

Higher education
Shaw University has an extramural site in Kannapolis offering undergraduate, graduate and continuing educational programs.

Ambassador Christian College has a campus in Kannapolis offering undergraduate and graduate degrees in Theology. The school was founded in 2003 by Dr. Keith Slough.

North Carolina Research Campus 

The North Carolina Research Campus in Kannapolis is a  research center.

Infrastructure

Transportation

Concord Kannapolis Area Transit, also known as Rider, provides multiple local bus routes, with its farthest point reaching Concord Mills Mall.

Charlotte Area Transit System (CATS) provides multiple transportation options including bus, vanpool or carpool. CATS provides a bus stop and parking at Kannapolis' Home Depot parking lot.

The Kannapolis Amtrak station is located at 201 South Main Street.

Notable people
 Tavis Bailey, Olympic discus thrower representing Team USA, competed at the 2016 Summer Olympics
 George Clinton, leader of Parliament-Funkadelic
 Dale Earnhardt, former 7-time NASCAR Cup Series champion, member of the NASCAR Hall of Fame
 Dale Earnhardt Jr., former NASCAR driver, member of the NASCAR Hall of Fame
 Kerry Earnhardt, former NASCAR driver
 Ralph Earnhardt, former NASCAR driver
 Carl Ford, member of the North Carolina Senate
 Daniel Hemric, current NASCAR driver
 Ethan Horton, former NFL tight end
 Argie Johnson, educator
 Kameron Marlowe, country music singer-songwriter
 Glenn McDuffie, retired World War II sailor, picture subject of V-J Day in Times Square
 James McDuffie, North Carolina Senator
 Kelley Earnhardt Miller, businesswoman and vice president of JR Motorsports
 Melissa Morrison-Howard, track hurdler and winner of two Olympic bronze medals
 Mike Morton, NFL linebacker, Super Bowl XXXIV champion with the St. Louis Rams
 Brandon Parker, NFL offensive tackle
 Corey Seager, MLB shortstop, 2020 World Series champion and MVP for the Los Angeles Dodgers
 Kyle Seager, MLB third baseman 
 George Shinn, former owner of the Charlotte Hornets
 Haskel Stanback, former NFL running back
 Dixie Upright, former MLB player
 Eddie Mills, actor

In popular culture
In 2004, a silent film about Kannapolis, showing the everyday behavior of ordinary people, which was made in 1941 by itinerant filmmaker H. Lee Waters, was selected by the Library of Congress for listing in the United States National Film Registry, as a representative of this kind of filmed "town portrait" popular in the 1930s and 1940s.

See also 
 List of municipalities in North Carolina

References

Further reading
 Minchin, Timothy J., "'It Knocked This City to Its Knees': The Closure of Pillowtex Mills in Kannapolis, North Carolina, and the Decline of the U.S. Textile Industry," Labor History 50 (Aug. 2009), 287–311
 Vanderburg, Timothy W. Cannon Mills and Kannapolis: Persistent Paternalism in a Textile Town (University of Tennessee Press; 2013) 255 pages

External links

 
 

 
Kannapolis
Cities in Cabarrus County, North Carolina
Cities in Rowan County, North Carolina
Charlotte metropolitan area
Populated places established in 1906
Company towns in North Carolina
1906 establishments in North Carolina